The women's long jump event at the 2004 World Junior Championships in Athletics was held in Grosseto, Italy, at Stadio Olimpico Carlo Zecchini on 16 and 17 July.

Medalists

Results

Final
17 July

Qualifications
16 July

Group A

Group B

Participation
According to an unofficial count, 22 athletes from 17 countries participated in the event.

References

Long jump
Long jump at the World Athletics U20 Championships